Ronja Fini Sturm (born 11 September 1995) is a German rower. She competed in the 2015 European Rowing Championships in Poznan winning a silver medal. At the 2016 Summer Olympics in Rio de Janeiro, she competed in women's lightweight double sculls with teammate Marie-Louise Dräger. They finished in 11th place.

References

External links
 
 
 
 

1995 births
Living people
German female rowers
Rowers from Berlin
Olympic rowers of Germany
Rowers at the 2016 Summer Olympics
20th-century German women
21st-century German women